Motorama is a Russian post-punk band from Rostov-on-Don, Russia. The band was formed in 2005. The group has received popularity not only in Russia but also abroad, especially in Europe, Latin America and Asia.

Musical style and influences
The band performs songs in English. Vladislav Parshin's vocals have often been compared with the voice of Ian Curtis, the frontman of the British band Joy Division. This, and the fact that Motorama played their first two mini-albums in a style close to the sound of classic post-punk, led to the fact that the group is often accused of copying Joy Division. Motorama’s singles demonstrate a more melodic and ghostly sound than Joy Division’s dark and fast paced punk. The situation has changed with the release of the group's first LP, Alps. This album featured intonations of New Wave and Indie pop, and the music in general became more bright and melancholic than depressive. 
The band is influenced by Soviet post-punk bands like Kino and Zvuki Mu, as well as ethereal wave. 

In 2010, a side-project of participants of the Motorama, the group Utro, released a Russian-language album.

Motorama's second studio album, Calendar, was released October 18, 2012 on the French label Talitres.

Vladislav Parshin and Irene Parshina formed another side-project, Leto v Gorode, in 2012. 

On June 27, 2014 Oleg Chernov became the new touring drummer, replacing Roman Belenky, who left the band for family reasons.

Irene Parshina became a tour manager of Motorama and Utro.

The third album, Poverty, was released January 26, 2015 via Talitres.

Single song "One Moment" was released on a special fifteenth anniversary Talitres vinyl in 2016.

The fourth album, Dialogues, was released in 2016 via Talitres.

The fifth album, Many Nights, was released in September 2018. 

In January 2020, the band left Talitres to start their label I'm Home Records.

Discography

Albums 
 Alps (2010)
 Calendar (2012)
 Poverty (2015)
 Dialogues (2016)
 Many Nights (2018)
 Before The Road (2021)

EPs 
 Horse (2008)
 Bear (2009)

Singles 
 One Moment (2011)
 Eyes (2013)
 She Is There (2014)
 Holy Day (2016)
 The New Era (2020)
 Today & Everyday (2020)
 Tomorrow (2022)
 Another Chance (2023)

References

External links 

 
 

I'm Home Records on Bandcamp

Russian musical groups
Russian rock music groups
Musical groups established in 2005
Post-punk revival music groups
Russian indie rock groups
Russian post-punk music groups